Dornbusch Lighthouse refers to the lighthouse officially designated as Leuchtfeuer Dornbusch/Hiddensee ("Dornbusch/Hiddensee Beacon") in the north of the German island of Hiddensee in Mecklenburg-Vorpommern on the Baltic Sea coast. Its international serial number is C 2588.

The lighthouse stands on the 72-metre-high Schluckswiek in the so-called Hochland ("highland") area of the island.

Access 
Since 1994 the lighthouse, with its 102 steps, has been open to the public. So that it does not become too crowded at the top, only 15 visitors may be admitted at any one time. Visitors must be at least six years old. When wind speeds reach Force 6 or higher, the tower is closed for safety reasons.

Technical details 
The lighthouse was built in 1887/1888 of brick construction. It was taken into service on 19 November 1888. It was modified from 1927 to 1929 and fitted with a reinforced-concrete shell. It is 28 metres high and has a focal height of 95 metres above mean sea level in the Baltic Sea. The observation gallery is located at a height of 20 metres. Its light has the following ranges: white 24.9 nautical miles (45 kilometres) and red 21.3 nautical miles (38 kilometres). Its characteristic is Flashing White Red, 2.4 seconds on, 7.6 seconds off. Its light source is a metal-halide lamp. The Stralsund Waterway and Shipping Office has responsible for the servicing and maintenance of the tower since 1990.

Postage stamps 
The first postage stamp that depicted Dornbusch Lighthouse appeared on 13 May 1975 and was issued by the Deutsche Post (GDR). The stamp belong to the series "Lighthouses, beacons, sector and breakwater lights" (Leuchttürme, Leit- Leucht- und Molenfeuer). It was designed by Jochen Bertholdt.

On 2 July 2009, the Deutsche Post issued a special postage stamp with a picture of Dornbusch Lighthouse to the value of 55 eurocents in the series "Lighthouses" (Leuchttürme). The design was of the indicia was by Professor Johannes Graf from Dortmund.

See also 

 List of lighthouses in Germany

Gallery

References

External links 

 Dornbusch Lighthouse 
 

Lighthouses in Germany
Buildings and structures in Vorpommern-Rügen
Hiddensee
Lighthouses completed in 1888